is a Japanese football player for Tochigi Uva FC.

Career
Toyoshima played with Kashiwa Reysol Academy from 2002 till 2009. During that period he got to be part of the Japanese national U14 and U15 teams. In August 2010, aged 20, he joins C.S. Visé playing in the 2011–12 Belgian Second Division.  Next, he plays with FC Zaria Bălți in the 2012–13 Moldovan National Division, then he joined FC Jūrmala playing in the 2013 Latvian Higher League. During winter-break of the 2013–14 season he joined Montenegrin side FK Lovćen, however made no appearances in the 2013–14 Montenegrin First League. Following season Toyoshima was loaned to FK Berane playing with them in the 2014–15 Montenegrin First League.

Club statistics
Updated to 23 February 2017.

References

External links

Profile at Football Lab

1991 births
Living people
Sportspeople from Ibaraki Prefecture
Japanese footballers
Moldovan Super Liga players
Latvian Higher League players
Montenegrin First League players
J3 League players
Japan Football League players
C.S. Visé players
CSF Bălți players
FC Jūrmala players
FK Lovćen players
FK Berane players
Iwate Grulla Morioka players
Tochigi City FC players
Japanese expatriate footballers
Expatriate footballers in Belgium
Japanese expatriate sportspeople in Belgium
Expatriate footballers in Moldova
Japanese expatriate sportspeople in Moldova
Expatriate footballers in Latvia
Japanese expatriate sportspeople in Latvia
Expatriate footballers in Montenegro
Japanese expatriate sportspeople in Montenegro
Association football midfielders